Silberberg is German for "Silver Mountain" or "Silver Hill" and may refer to:

Mountains, hills and hill spurs 
Austria
 Silberberg (Tyrol) (ca. 1,200 m; mit Silberbergalm, 1,175 m), near Reith im Alpbachtal (near Brixlegg), Inn valley, North Tyrol

 Germany
 Großer Silberberg (ca. 81 m), in Magdeburg, Saxony-Anhalt
 Kleiner Silberberg (ca. 59 m), in Magdeburg, Saxony-Anhalt
 Silberberg (Ahrweiler) (295.1 m), near Bad Neuenahr-Ahrweiler, county of Ahrweiler, Rhineland-Palatinate
 Silberberg (Bodenheim) (ca. 211 m), highest point in the municipality of Bodenheim, county of Mainz-Bingen, Rhineland-Palatinate
 Silberberg (Bodenmais) (Bischofshaube; ca. 955 m), in Bodenmais, county of Regen, Bayern
 Silberberg (Greifswald) (4.3 m), in Greifswald, Landkreis county of Vorpommern-Greifswald, Mecklenburg-Western Pomerania
 Silberberg (Hagen am Teutoburger Wald) (179.8 m), near Hagen am Teutoburger Wald, county of Osnabrück, Lower Saxony
 Silberberg (Mühlhausen) (431.6 m), near Mühlhausen an der Würm, county of Enzkreis, Baden-Württemberg
 Silberberg (Kellerwald) (ca. 523 m), in the Kellerwald near Hundsdorf (Bad Wildungen, county of Waldeck-Frankenberg, Hesse
 Silberberg (Thuringian Forest) (770.6 m) near  Möhrenbach, Ilm-Kreis, Thuringia
 Silberberg (Todtnau) (1,358.2 m), near Todtnau, in the Southern Black Forest, county of Lörrach, Baden-Württemberg
 Silberberg (Wingst) (ca. 74 m), near Dobrock, in the Wingst, county of Cuxhaven, Lower Saxony
 Silberberg (Winterberg-Silbach) (747.5 m), bei Winterberg-Silbach, county of Hochsauerlandkreis, North Rhine-Westphalia

Poland
Silberberg, a hill north of Wolin, Poland, according to the Nordisk familjebok site of the Jomsborg Viking stronghold

Places 
Austria
 Silberberg (Deutschfeistritz), village in the municipality of Deutschfeistritz, Styria
 Silberberg (Kogelberg), hamlet in the municipality of Kaindorf an der Sulm, Styria
 Silberberg (Kaltenberg), cadastral municipality and village in the municipality of Kaltenberg, Upper Austria

Czech Republic
 Silberberg, German name for Orlovice, village in Pocinovice
 Silberberg, German name for a village in Nalžovské Hory

Germany
 Silberberg (Leonberg), district of Leonberg, Baden-Württemberg
 Silberberg (Renningen), district of Renningen, Baden-Württemberg
 Silberberg (Bad Saarow), residential area of Bad Saarow, Brandenburg
 Großer Silberberg (district), district of Magdeburg, Saxony-Anhalt

Places in Poland
Silberberg, German name for Srebrna Góra, Lower Silesian Voivodeship, Poland
Silberberg, German name for Święciechów, village in Drawno

Other meanings 
Burgruine Silberberg, a castle in Carinthia, Austria
Oflag VIII-B Silberberg, a World War II German POW camp